João Antônio de Albuquerque e Souza (born August 23, 1983 in Porto Alegre, Rio Grande do Sul) is a Brazilian foil fencer. Souza represented Brazil at the 2008 Summer Olympics in Beijing, where he competed in the individual foil event. He lost the first preliminary match to Japan's Yuki Ota, with a score of 4–15.

Souza also won a bronze medal for his category at the 2007 Pan American Games in Rio de Janeiro.

References

External links
Profile – FIE

Brazilian male foil fencers
Living people
Olympic fencers of Brazil
Fencers at the 2008 Summer Olympics
Sportspeople from Porto Alegre
1983 births
Pan American Games bronze medalists for Brazil
Pan American Games medalists in fencing
South American Games gold medalists for Brazil
South American Games bronze medalists for Brazil
South American Games medalists in fencing
Fencers at the 2007 Pan American Games
Competitors at the 2010 South American Games
Medalists at the 2007 Pan American Games
21st-century Brazilian people